Ed Hill may refer to:

 Eddie Hill (born 1936), American drag racer
 Edwin D. Hill (Edwin D. "Ed" Hill, born 1937), American electrical worker, labor union activist and labor leader
 Ed Hill (active 1970 and after), American country music songwriter
 Ed Hill (comedian) (born 1984), Taiwanese-Canadian stand-up comedian and podcaster
 E. D. Hill (born 1962), American journalist and news presenter

See also 
 Edward Hill (disambiguation)
 Ted Hill (disambiguation)
 Hill (surname)
 All pages with titles containing "Ed Hill"